This is a sortable table of the townlands in the barony of Muskerry West,  County Cork, Ireland.
Duplicate names occur where there is more than one townland with the same name in the barony (such as Glebe), and also where a townland is known by two alternative names. Names marked in bold typeface are towns and villages, and the word Town appears for those entries in the area column. Towns shown below are Inchigeelagh, Macroom, Millstreet.

The smallest townland in West Muskerry is Glebe in Kilcorney at 13 acres. The largest is Caherbarnagh at 3,626 acres.

Townland list

See also 

 Lists of townlands of County Cork
 List of civil parishes of County Cork

References

Muskerry West